Bulbophyllum lewisense, commonly known as the Mount Lewis rope orchid, is a species of epiphytic orchid with pseudobulbs and pale brown bracts arranged along the stems. Each pseudobulb has a single, dark green, channelled leaf and a single white flower with pointed tips on the sepals. It grows on the higher branches of rainforest trees, often where it is exposed to breezes on the higher tablelands of tropical North Queensland.

Description
Flowering occurs from August to October.

Taxonomy and naming
Bulbophyllum lewisense was first formally described in 1989 by Bruce Gray and David Jones who published the description in Austrobaileya from a specimen collected in the Mount Lewis National Park by Gray. The specific epithet (lewisense) refers to the type location.

Distribution and habitat
The Mount Lewis rope orchid grows on the upper branches of rainforest trees, especially where there is free air movement.

References

lewisense
Orchids of Queensland
Endemic orchids of Australia
Plants described in 1989

Bulbophyllum lamingtonense